Dobrovlje is a settlement in the Municipality of Zreče in northeastern Slovenia. It lies on the Dravinja River, halfway between Zreče and Slovenske Konjice. The area is part of the traditional region of Styria. It is now included with the rest of the municipality in the Savinja Statistical Region.

References

External links
Dobrovlje at Geopedia

Populated places in the Municipality of Zreče